Transfiguration Roman Catholic Church in Navahrudak, Belarus, is a Baroque church erected in 1712–1723, replacing an earlier Gothic building from the late 14th century, and originally consecrated under the title of Corpus Christi. Two Gothic chapels survive and are included in the Baroque building.

In 1799 the poet Adam Mickiewicz was baptized in this church.

Closed in 1857, re-opened in 1906. Currently active.

History 

Vytautas the Great founded the church in 1395 on the site of a former pagan temple. In 1422 Władysław II Jagiełło married here his fourth wife Sophia of Halshany, establishing the Jagiellonian dynasty. In 1643 local castellan Jan Rudamina added a marble bas-relief in commemoration of the Navahrudaks knights fallen in the Battle of Khotyn in 1621.

In 1712-1740 the church was rebuilt. The local masons Jacop Boksha, Jury Urlovsky, Andrej Sharetzki and Jury Stolpkovsky headed the construction. The keystone was consecrated on July 14, 1714, by the bishop . The building was designed as a one-nave basilica with round apse and two towers at the main facade. Two older faceted towers of XIV century were also included into the new building.

On February 12, 1799, the poet Adam Mickiewicz was baptised here. In 1812 during the French invasion of Russia Napoleon’s troops used the church as a food storage. After the war the services in the church were resumed, but in 1864 it was closed again in the aftermath of the January Uprising.

The building decayed until 1906. In 1921 it was reconstructed by prince Stanisław Albrecht Radziwiłł and architect Bayle. The bishop Zygmunt Łoziński consecrated the restored church in 1922. In 1929 it was given to the Sisters of the Holy Family of Nazareth.

During the World War II the city was occupied by the Nazis. The sisterhood organized a clandestine school for Polish children with lessons on history and Polish language. On August 1, 1943, the Gestapo executed 11 nuns and the school’s principal. The burial place of the Martyrs of Nowogródek existed near the church until 1991.

Under the Soviets the church was closed in 1948 and reopened only in 1984. The services were resumed in 1992. The latest restoration was completed in 1998.

See also 

Transfiguration

References

Sources

Roman Catholic churches in Belarus
Navahrudak
Gothic architecture in Belarus
Baroque church buildings in Belarus
Churches completed in 1723
18th-century Roman Catholic church buildings in Belarus